Arend Dickmann, (1572 – 28 November 1627) ​also originally spelled as Dijckman, was an Admiral of the Polish–Lithuanian Commonwealth Navy, that commanded the fleet in the Battle of Oliwa in 1627, during the Polish–Swedish War.

History

Before the military service 
Dickmann was Dutch born in Delft, Netherlands in 1572. Since 1608, he lived in Gdańsk, Polish–Lithuanian Commonwealth, where he was the captain and owner of a merchant ship that transported cereal and oak wood.

Military service 
In 1626, he joined the Polish–Lithuanian Commonwealth Navy during the Polish–Swedish War. On 24 November 1627, he was given the rank of admiral, becoming the commander-in-chief of the navy. He served aboard the fleet flagship Ritter Sankt Georg. On 28 November 1627, he commanded the fleet during the Battle of Oliwa, a major encounter during the war, that was fought in the Gdańsk Bay. During the battle, his ship had attacked and boarded the enemy galleon Tigern. The fight aboard the ship ended with a Polish victory and the capture of the vessel. Dickmann also forced the crew of another, the Solen, to scuttle their vessel. Ritter Sankt Georg had also fired from the broadside, hitting the enemy galleon Pelikanen. Dickmann had died at the end of the battle, aboard the Tigern, being hit with a stray round shot, that was probably shot from the enemy Pelikanen, or in friendly fire from Fliegender Hirsch. Ritter Sankt Georg itself sustained the damages in the battle, including being hit 3 times under the line of water.

The funeral 
He was ceremonially buried on 2 December 1627 in Gdańsk, in St. Mary's Church. The funeral was financed by the king Sigismund III Vasa. Before his coffin marched 33 pairs of bound Swedish prisoners of war. The coffin was accompanied by a marine guard of honour, royal officials, and members of the City Council. The coffin was laid to rest in the northern wall of the chancel, near the Saint John chapel.

Citations

References

Bibliography 
 J. Pertek: Polacy na morzach i oceanach, vol. 1, Poznań: Wydaw. Poznańskie, 1981, ISBN 83-210-0141-6, OCLC 749548852.

1572 births
1627 deaths
Polish Navy admirals
Dutch sailors
People from Delft
Military personnel from Gdańsk
Deaths by projectile weapons